Admiral John Edward Walcott (1790–1868) was a British naval officer and politician.

Life
He was born the third son of Edmond Walcott Sympson, of Winkton, Hampshire. He joined the Royal Navy in 1802 as a First Class volunteer on HMS Blenheim in which he sailed to the West Indies. He then transferred in 1804 to the newly commissioned HMS Lively, which in company with Medusa,  and Amphion captured three Spanish bullion ships and sank a fourth in the action of 5 October 1804.

He then sailed under his friend Sir Samuel Hood on a number of different ships until Hood's death in 1814, taking part in the second Battle of Copenhagen in 1807. Promoted to signal-lieutenant on HMS Centaur in 1808 he was involved in the capture and burning of the 74-gun Russian ship Vsevolod off Rager Vik, the Russian naval base in Estonia.

In 1823, commanding HMS Tyne and in company with HMS Thracian, Walcott was sent in search of pirate ships off the coast of Cuba and discovered the Zaragozana, a notorious pirate schooner, which they captured after a gunfight, along with the survivors of the pirate crew. The latter were subsequently hanged.

He became a Member of Parliament for Christchurch in 1852.

He was advanced to the rank of Admiral on the Retired List on 1 May 1863.

Family
Walcott married, in 1819, Charlotte Anne, daughter of Colonel John Nelley of the Bengal Artillery, and had a son, the clergyman Mackenzie Walcott, and two daughters.

Sources

1790 births
1868 deaths
Members of the Parliament of the United Kingdom for English constituencies
Royal Navy admirals
UK MPs 1852–1857
UK MPs 1857–1859
UK MPs 1859–1865
UK MPs 1865–1868